Clayton County is a county located in the U.S. state of Iowa. As of the 2020 census, the population was 17,043. Its county seat is Elkader. The county was established in 1837 and was named in honor of John M. Clayton, United States Senator from Delaware and later Secretary of State under President Zachary Taylor.

Geography

It is the fifth-largest county in Iowa by area.

Adjacent counties

Allamakee County (north)
Crawford County, Wisconsin (northeast)
Grant County, Wisconsin (east)
Dubuque County (southeast)
Delaware County (south)
Buchanan County (southwest)
Fayette County (west)
Winneshiek County (northwest)

Major highways

 U.S. Highway 18
 U.S. Highway 52
 Iowa Highway 3
 Iowa Highway 13
 Iowa Highway 56
 Iowa Highway 76
 Iowa Highway 128

National protected areas
 Driftless Area National Wildlife Refuge (part)
 Effigy Mounds National Monument (part)
 Upper Mississippi River National Wildlife and Fish Refuge (part)

Geology
Clayton County is part of the Driftless Area, a region that completely missed being ice-covered during the last ice age. Streams have deeply carved valleys, while the Mississippi River has spectacular bluffs.

Demographics

2020 census
There were 8,758 housing units, of which 7,315 were occupied.

2010 census
There were 8,999 housing units, of which 7,599 were occupied.

2000 census
	
As of the census of 2000, there were 18,678 people, about 7,500 households, and 1 family residing in the county.  The population density was 24 people per square mile (9/km2).  There were 8,620 housing units at an average density of 11 per square mile (4/km2).  The racial makeup of the county was 98.93% White, 0.14% Black or African American, 0.22% Native American, 0.11% Asian, 0.01% Pacific Islander, 0.19% from other races, and 0.41% from two or more races.  0.76% of the population were Hispanic or Latino of any race.

There were 7,375 households, out of which 30.90% had children under the age of 18 living with them, 59.70% were married couples living together, 6.10% had a female householder with no husband present, and 30.40% were non-families. 26.30% of all households were made up of individuals, and 13.30% had someone living alone who was 65 years of age or older.  The average household size was 2.47 and the average family size was 2.98.

In the county, the population was spread out, with 25.40% under the age of 18, 6.50% from 18 to 24, 26.00% from 25 to 44, 23.60% from 45 to 64, and 18.50% who were 65 years of age or older.  The median age was 40 years. For every 100 females, there were 97.60 males.  For every 100 females age 18 and over, there were 95.50 males.

The median income for a household in the county was $34,068, and the median income for a family was $40,199. Males had a median income of $27,165 versus $19,644 for females. The per capita income for the county was $16,930.  About 5.70% of families and 8.60% of the population were below the poverty line, including 9.60% of those under age 18 and 9.40% of those age 65 or over.

Communities

Cities

Clayton
Edgewood
Elkader
Elkport
Farmersburg
Garber
Garnavillo
Guttenberg
Luana
Marquette
McGregor
Monona
North Buena Vista
Osterdock
Postville
St. Olaf
Strawberry Point
Volga

Unincorporated communities

Beulah
Ceres
Clayton Center
Communia
Eckards
Fairview
Froelich
Giard
Gunder
Hardin
Highland
Littleport
McGregor Heights
Mederville
Millville
Motor
Osborne
Saint Sebald
Thomasville
Turkey River
Updegraff
Watson
Wood

Townships
Clayton County is divided into these townships:

 Boardman
 Buena Vista
 Cass
 Clayton
 Cox Creek
 Elk
 Farmersburg
 Garnavillo
 Giard
 Grand Meadow
 Highland
 Jefferson
 Lodomillo
 Mallory
 Marion
 Mendon
 Millville
 Monona
 Read
 Sperry
 Volga
 Wagner

Population ranking
The population ranking of the following table is based on the 2020 census of Clayton County.

† county seat

Politics

See also

National Register of Historic Places listings in Clayton County, Iowa
Clayton County Courthouse

References

External links

 
Clayton County Development Corporation's website
Clayton County Health and Demographic Data 

 
1837 establishments in Wisconsin Territory
Populated places established in 1837
Driftless Area
Iowa counties on the Mississippi River